Rosier may refer to:

 Rosier (demon), a name included in Gustav Davidson’s 1967 A Dictionary Of Angels
 "Rosier" (song), a 1994 single by Luna Sea
 Rosier (surname), including a list of people with the name

See also 
 Le Rosier de Madame Husson, an 1887 novella by Guy de Maupassant
 Le Rosier miraculeux, a 1904 French short silent film
 Saint-Hilaire-du-Rosier, a commune in the Isère department, France